Rear Admiral Atle Torbjørn Karlsvik (born 22 June 1957) is a Norwegian naval officer.

Karlsvik has among other been the leader of the Norwegian Naval Academy.

References

Trials in Norway
1957 births
Living people
Academic staff of the Royal Norwegian Naval Academy
Royal Norwegian Navy admirals
Bundeswehr Command and Staff College alumni